Sardarabad Rural District is a rural district (dehestan) in the Central District of Shushtar County, Khuzestan Province, Iran. At the 2006 census, its population was 23,930, in 4,464 families.  The rural district has 13 villages.

References 

Rural Districts of Khuzestan Province
Shushtar County